Gerrit de Graeff (II) van Zuid-Polsbroek (23 December 1741 in Amsterdam – 20 December 1811 at Ilpenstein) was a member of the De Graeff family from Amsterdam. He was a Dutch politician at local and national Level. He belonged to the patrician class of Amsterdam and held the feudal titles Free Lord of Zuid-Polsbroek as those of Purmerland and Ilpendam.

Biography 
Gerrit de Graeff was a son of Gerrit de Graeff (I.) van Zuid-Polsbroek (1711-1752) and his second wife Elizabeth Lestevenon (1716–1766). Gerrit was related through his father's marriages to the diplomat Mattheus Lestevenon and Apollonius Jan Cornelis Lampsins, Baron of Tobago. After his father's death in 1752 his older brother Joan de Graeff inherited the title Free Lord (Vrijheer) of Zuid-Polsbroek, and after his death in 1754 Gerrit succeeded him there. In 1766 after the death of his mother he succeeded as Free Lord of Purmerland and Ilpendam. He received his doctorate on 28 July 1763 at the University of Leiden. In 1785 he married Christina van Herzeele, with whom he had two children; Gerrit III de Graeff and Geertruid Elisabeth de Graeff (1776-1857), who was married to general Gijsbert Carel Rutger Reinier van Brienen van Ramerus (1771-1821).

Gerrit de Graeff was a Remonstrant and patriotic politician in the tradition of the 17th century regents of the Dutch States Party. Between 1762 and 1787 he held various government posts in Amsterdam, including Vroedschap, Schepen (1771), Councilor (1771-1781) and Commissioner (1762). In 1776 he was named as commissioner of the 't Zandpad in the Noorderkwartier.

In 1787, after the invasion of Prussian troops in the Netherlands and the reinstatement of Stadtholder William V of Orange, he was expelled from the city government together with Hendrik Hooft because of his democratic sentiments.

After the French troops had invaded and the Batavian Republic was founded, Gerrit was again admitted to the city government in 1795. In 1799 he was appointed a member of the Governing Council Vertegenwoordigend Lichaam (parliament during the Batavian Republic) In 1803 he was named Wethouder and Council of Amsterdam.

Gerrit de Graeff died on 20 December 1811 at Ilpenstein Castle. His burial chapel is located in the Reformed Church in Ilpendam.

Notes

1741 births
1811 deaths
Nobility from Amsterdam
Gerrit II, Graeff de
Lords of Purmerland and Ilpendam
Lords of Zuid-Polsbroek
Aldermen of Amsterdam